The Mitchell River is a tributary of the Yadkin River in northwestern North Carolina in the United States. Via the Yadkin it is part of the watershed of the Pee Dee River, which flows to the Atlantic Ocean. According to the Geographic Names Information System, it has also been known historically as "Mitchells River," "Mitchels River," and "Mountain Creek."

The Mitchell rises in eastern Alleghany County in the Blue Ridge Mountains, and flows generally southeastwardly through Surry County, where it joins the Yadkin River about 5 mi (8 km) northeast of Elkin at the community of Burch.

In Surry County, it collects the short South Fork Mitchell River, which has also been known historically as "Mill Creek," "South Fork Creek," and "South Fork Mitchells River." The river is a popular destination for anglers who catch Brown, Brook, and rainbow trout.

See also 
 List of North Carolina rivers

References 

Rivers of North Carolina
Rivers of Alleghany County, North Carolina
Rivers of Surry County, North Carolina
Tributaries of the Pee Dee River